Kuşkayası (Turkish for Bird's rock) is a roadside monument just outside the town of Amasra, in Bartın Province, in the Black Sea Region of Turkey. It was erected in the Roman Imperial age.

Location
It can be reached by a staircase from the road.

History 
The Kuşkayası road monument is a unique structure in Turkey. It was built by Gaius Julius Aquila, procurator of Bithynia et Pontus, in honor of Roman Emperor Tiberius Claudius Germanicus (AD 41–54). The monument includes a statue of a now headless human figure, the Roman eagle (also headless) and a bilingual inscription, all carved into the mountain. The  human figure may represent either the Emperor or the Governor. In the original monument there was also a fountain (which no longer exists).

Inscription 
The inscription is in Latin and Greek translations, which allow lacunae in one to be supplemented by the surviving text of the other.

References 

Buildings and structures in Bartın Province
Archaeological sites in the Black Sea Region
Roman sites in Turkey
Monuments and memorials in Turkey
Steles in Turkey
History of Bartın Province
1st-century inscriptions